The 1930 season was the first competitive season of São Paulo Futebol Clube that was founded on January 25. The club was created by an association between former members from Associação Atlética das Palmeiras and Club Athletico Paulistano, both teams had their football department closed in face of the advent of professional football. The new club led his name in honor of city of São Paulo and was opened at anniversary day of town being officially founded at the after day. At the end of his debut season the team reached the second position of Campeonato Paulista won by rival Corinthians.

Scorers

Overall

{|class="wikitable"
|-
|Games played || 31 (26 Campeonato Paulista, 5 Friendly match)
|-
|Games won ||  19 (16 Campeonato Paulista, 3 Friendly match)
|-
|Games drawn ||  10 (9 Campeonato Paulista, 1 Friendly match)
|-
|Games lost ||  2 (1 Campeonato Paulista, 1 Friendly match)
|-
|Goals scored || 91
|-
|Goals conceded || 36
|-
|Goal difference || +55
|-
|Best result || 6–1 (A) v Juventus - Friendly match - 1930.3.23
|-
|Worst result || 1–2 (A) v Vasco da Gama - Friendly match - 1930.5.131–2 (A) v Corinthians - Campeonato Paulista - 1930.5.25
|-
|Top scorer || Friedenreich (31)
|-

Friendlies

Official competitions

Campeonato Paulista

Record

External links
official website 

Association football clubs 1930 season
1930
1930 in Brazilian football